Elsa Jacqueline Barraine (13 February 1910, in Paris – 20 March 1999, in Strasbourg) was a composer of French music in the time after the neoclassicist movement of Les Six, Ravel, and Stravinsky.  Despite being considered “one of the outstanding French composers of the mid-20th century,” Barraine's music is seldom performed today.  She won the Prix de Rome in 1929 for La vierge guerrière, a sacred trilogy named for Joan of Arc, and was the fourth woman ever to receive that prestigious award (after Lili Boulanger in 1913, Marguerite Canal in 1920, and Jeanne Leleu in 1923).

Biography 

Born in Paris to Alfred Barraine, the principal cellist of the Orchestre de l’Opéra, and Mme. Barraine, Elsa Barraine began studying piano at a young age.  She attended the Conservatoire de Paris and studied composition with Paul Dukas, whose impressive list of students includes Yvonne Desportes, Maurice Duruflé, Claude Arrieu, and Olivier Messiaen.  Barraine and Messiaen were good friends throughout their lives and kept in frequent contact.  A talented pupil, Barraine won First Prize in harmony at the Conservatoire at age fifteen (1925) and then in fugue and accompaniment when she was seventeen (1927).  In 1929 she won the Prix de Rome for her cantata La vierge guerrière, making her the fourth female winner since the competition began in 1803.  Her piece Harald Harfagard (1930), symphonic variations based on the poetry of Heinrich Heine, was the first composition of Barraine's to gain public recognition.  This was her first work of many to take inspiration from literature, such as the later Avis (1944) and L’homme sur terre (1949), both based on Paul Éluard texts.

Barraine worked at the French National Radio from 1936 to 1940 as a pianist, sound recordist, and the head of singing, then after World War II as a sound mixer.  During the war, Barraine was heavily involved in the French Resistance and was a member of the Front National des Musiciens.  Between 1944 and 1947 she held the position of Recording Director at the well-established record label Le Chant du Monde.  In 1953 Barraine was appointed to the faculty at the Paris Conservatoire, where she taught analysis and sight-reading until 1972.  It was then that the Ministry of Culture named her Director of Music, giving her charge of all French national lyric theaters.

Compositional style

According to James Briscoe in his New Historical Anthology of Music by Women, “The music of Elsa Barraine wins over its listeners by a contrapuntal independence of line, virtuosity, and expressive intensity through motivic and rhythmic drive.”  It should also be noted that through her time studying with Dukas and the musical influence of Debussy, Barraine developed a keen and effective sense of instrumental timbre and color.  She embraced classic forms while making them her own, and used an entirely tonal harmonic language with one notable exception.  Her chamber work Musique rituelle (1967) for organ, gongs, and xylorimba features serialism and is inspired by the Tibetan Book of the Dead.

The authors of The Norton/Grove Dictionary of Women Composers observe the following:

Profoundly sensitive to the enormous upheavals of her time, Barraine was unable to dissociate her creative processes from her personal, humanist, political and social pre-occupations.

In all of Elsa Barraine's works there is an ardent focus on the human condition.  Like her contemporaries who formed La Jeune France, André Jolivet, Olivier Messiaen, Daniel-Lesur, and Yves Baudrier, she strove to reintroduce humanism to composition, an art becoming increasingly more abstract.  While some of her pieces address specific social and political issues, others explore a particular emotion or psychological state.  Examples of the former include Claudine à l’école (1950), her ballet based on a book by Colette which explores women's sexuality, and her anti-fascist symphonic poem Pogromes (1933).  An example of the latter is Barraine's programmatic woodwind quintet Ouvrage de Dame (1931 - Ed. A.J.Andraud, 1939).  The quintet has eight movements, the Theme and seven Variations which are named after fictional women with different personality types ("Angélique ; Berthe, aux sonorités dures ; Irène, sinueuse ; Barbe, fugato burlesque ; Sarah ; Isabeau de Bavière, avec son chapeau conique et son voile flottant ; Léocadie, vieille fille sentimentale du temps jadis").  She makes clear the differences in temperament of the seven women with her talent for characterization and skillful use of timbre.  Once again in the words of James Briscoe, “Her contribution to music is significant, and Elsa Barraine is a major force awaiting full discovery by performers and critics.”

List of Compositions 
Chamber music
Quintet: piano-strings 
Quintet: winds • (1931) • chamber music for winds
Musique Rituelle: organ-gongs-xylorimba • (1967) • Trio
Variations: piano percussion • (1950) • Duo
Suite Juive: violin-piano • (1951) • Duo
Improvisation: saxophone-piano • (1947) • duo
Ouvrage de Dame • (1937) • chamber music with diverse instruments
Opera and lyrical music
Vierge Guerriere (La) • profane cantata : solo-choir-orchestra
Roi Bossu (Le) • (1932) • Comic opera
Mur (Le): ballet • (1947) • Ballet
Printemps de la Liberte: play music • (1948) 
Chanson du Mal-Aime (La): ballet • (1950) 
Claudine à l'Ecole: ballet • (1950) 
Christine • (1959) • solo-choir-orchestra
Film scores
 White Paws • (1949)
Sabotier du Val de Loire (Le) • (1956)
Vocal music
Melodies • (1930)
Chansons Hebraiques • (1935) 
Chants Juifs • (1937) 
Avis • (1944) • Choir-orchestra
Poesie Ininterrompue • (1948) • Cantata : 2 voices-orchestra
Homme sur Terre (L') • (1949) • Choir-orchestra
Paysans (Les) • (1958) • Cantates : 2 voices-orchestra
De Premier en Premier Mai • (1977) • Choir
Instrumental music
Prelude: piano • (1930) • character piece
Hommage à Paul Dukas: piano • (1936) 
Marche du Printemps sans Amour: piano • (1946)
Boite de Pandore (La): piano • (1955) 
Fantaisie: cembalo • (1961) • character piece
Preludes et Fugues: organ 
Symphonic music
Symphony 1 • (1931) 
Symphony 2 • (1938) 
Suite 'Astrologique': small orchestra • (1945) 
Variations sur "Le fleuve rouge": orchestra • (1945) 
Concertante music
Hommage à Prokofiev: cembalo-orchestra • (1953) • 
Atmosphere: oboe-10 strings • (1966) 
Sacred music
Cantique du Vendredi Saint • (1955) • Hymns

Social and political issues

Criticism and sexism

Despite winning numerous prestigious awards, Elsa Barraine dealt with sexist attitudes in her professional career.  Karin Pendle cites music critic René Dumesnil as an unfortunately common offender: “Like others of his time (and even today), Dumesnil voiced a kind of grudging respect for many of these composers as long as they were content to remain feminine in their music.”  Dumesnil once described Barraine's fellow Prix de Rome prizewinner Jeanne Leleu as having “a vigor that one rarely encounters in works by women.”  As for Barraine, he referred to her as “the writer of prettily orchestrated melodies.”

Involvement in the French Resistance

Elsa Barraine was an active member of the Front National des Musiciens, an organization of musicians involved in the French Resistance during the German Occupation between 1940 and 1944.  The main goals of the organization were listed in their journal, Musiciens d’Aujourd’hui, and were to organize concerts of new and banned French music, to support Jewish musicians by providing shelter or money, to arrange anti-German and anti-Collaborationist protests, and to engage in any and all forms of musical rebellion.  The résistant French conductor Roger Désormière, Les Six member Louis Durey, and Barraine together released a “manifesto for ‘the defence of French music’ and against any collaboration with the Nazis.”  Her heavy involvement in the Resistance was particularly brave, considering the fact that she seems to have had a Jewish background.

Notes

References

Cited sources

Briscoe, James R. New Historical Anthology of Music by Women. Bloomington: Indiana University Press, 2004.
Germain-David, Pierrette. “Une compositrices, actrice du XXème siècle, Elsa Barraine (1910-1999).” Association Femmes et Musique, Paris. https://web.archive.org/web/20130830060750/http://femmesetmusique.com/actualite.html (accessed Nov. 9, 2012).
Grove Music Online, S.v. “Barraine, Elsa,” by Françoise Andrieux and James R. Briscoe. http://www.oxfordmusiconline.com/subscriber/article/grove/music/02102 (accessed Nov. 9, 2012).
Pendle, Karin. Women and Music. 2nd ed. Bloomington: Indiana University Press, 2001.
Sadie, Julie Anne, and Rhian Samuel. The Norton/Grove Dictionary of Women Composers. New York: W.W. Norton, 1994.
Simeone, Nigel. “Making Music in Occupied Paris.” The Musical Times 147, no. 1894 (Spring 2006), https://www.jstor.org/stable/25434357 (accessed Nov. 9, 2012).

Additional sources

Bourin, Odile, and Pierrette Germain-David. Elsa Barraine (1910-1999): une compositrice au XXe siècle. Sampzon: Editions Delatour France, 2010.
Moulder, Earline. “Jewish Themes in Elsa Barraine’s Second Prelude and Fugue for Organ.” Women of Note Quarterly: The Magazine of Historical and Contemporary Women Composers 3, no. 3 (Aug. 1995): 22-29, 31.
Moulder, Earline. “Rediscovering the Organ Works of Elsa Barraine.” Women of Note Quarterly: The Magazine of Historical and Contemporary Women Composers 3, no. 2 (May 1995): 21-29.
Ripley, Colette S. “Organ Music by French Women Composers.” American Organist Magazine 28 (Nov. 1994): 56-61.

External links
Works list from Grove Music Online
http://www.oxfordmusiconline.com/subscriber/article_works/grove/music/02102#S02102.1
YouTube recording of Symphony No. 2, performed by the ORTF Symphony Orchestra conducted by Manuel Rosenthal
https://www.youtube.com/watch?v=yPnUkjjfpp0
Catalogue of resources pertaining to Barraine in the Bibliothèque nationale de France 
https://data.bnf.fr/fr/14020314/elsa_barraine/

1910 births
1999 deaths
Academic staff of the Conservatoire de Paris
Conservatoire de Paris alumni
French classical composers
French women classical composers
Prix de Rome for composition
Musicians from Paris
20th-century classical composers
20th-century French women musicians
20th-century French composers
Women music educators
20th-century women composers